Imran Parvez (born 28 December 1977, in Rajshahi) is a Bangladeshi former first-class cricketer active 2000–2004, who is also known by his nickname 'Ripon'. After retiring from cricket he became an umpire and officates matches domestic cricket.

Career

Playing career
He made his debut for Rajshahi Division in 2000/01, playing for them until 2003/04. He took 76 first-class wickets with his off breaks, with a best of 5 for 35 against Barisal Division. His other five wicket haul, 5 for 82, came against Chittagong Division.  A tail end right-handed batsman, his best score of 37* came against Barisal Division.

Umpiring career
He is now an umpire and stood in matches in Bangladesh's National Cricket League.

Controversies
In a group match between Abahani Limited and Mohammedan Sporting Club in the 2021 Dhaka Premier Division Twenty20 Cricket League, Abahani cricketer Shakib Al Hasan, firstly, kicked the stumps and argued with him for a wrongful decision and later Shakib again ran from his mid-off position to uproot all the stumps at the non-striker's end when both the match officials called for a rain break and Shakib again got involved in a heated argument with them.Shakib claimed there's biased umpiring in DPL.

References

1977 births
Living people
Bangladeshi cricketers
Bangladeshi cricket umpires
Rajshahi Division cricketers